Yevgeny Kafelnikov and Daniel Vacek successfully defended their title defeated Todd Woodbridge and Mark Woodforde in the final, 7–6(14–12), 4–6, 6–3 to win the men's doubles title at the French Open.

Woobridge and Woodforde (collectively known as The Woodies) attempted their chance to make history to complete all four Grand Slams at once, having won the previous year's Wimbledon, US Open and Australian Open earlier that year. But they lost to Kafelnikov and Vacek, ending their 23-winning match streak. This feat would later achieve by Bob and Mike Bryan in the 2013 Wimbledon Championships.

Seeds
Champion seeds are indicated in bold text while text in italics indicates the round in which those seeds were eliminated.

Draw

Finals

Top half

Section 1

Section 2

Bottom half

Section 3

Section 4

References

External links
 Association of Tennis Professionals (ATP) – main draw
1997 French Open – Men's draws and results at the International Tennis Federation

Men's Doubles
French Open by year – Men's doubles